RWBY is an ongoing American web series created by Monty Oum and produced by Rooster Teeth Productions. RWBY premiered on July 18, 2013 on the Rooster Teeth website. Episodes were later uploaded to YouTube and streaming websites such as Crunchyroll. As of February 2023, 107 episodes, spanning across 9 volumes, have been released.  Vol 9 premiered on February 18, 2023, and will conclude on April 22, 2023.

Series overview

Episodes

Before the premiere of Volume 1, four trailers were released: the "Red", "White", "Black", and "Yellow" , each focusing on one of the series' main protagonists.

(2013)

Volume 1 was released between July 18 and November 7, 2013. Chapters premiered to the public Thursdays at 7 pm Central Standard Time (UTC-6) on the Rooster Teeth website and were released two hours early for "sponsors". They were uploaded to YouTube a week later. Crunchyroll announced on August 16, 2013, that RWBY would be simulcast on the video streaming site.

The DVD/Blu-ray release of Volume 1 has 10 episodes, resulting from combining the "Part 2" episodes with their respective first parts.

(2014)

Volume 2 premiered on July 24, 2014, following an exclusive screening of Chapter 1 at RTX on July 4, 2014. The weekly release date and time for new chapters were the same as for Volume 1. The season concluded on October 30, 2014.

(2015–16)

Volume 3 was confirmed at the Rooster Teeth panel at PAX Prime 2014, where creator and director Monty Oum stated that he planned to go into development of the next Volume right after he was done with Volume 2. The release of Volume 3 was postponed because of Oum's sudden passing in early 2015. Weeks later, producer Gray Haddock announced that the series would continue, with Volume 3 premiering in 2015. Chapter 1 was released for "sponsors" only on October 24, 2015, followed by the release on YouTube the following day. Starting with Volume 3, the release day for new Chapters was changed from Thursday to Saturday, with a new release time of 10 am CST. Before the release of Chapter 7, Gray Haddock announced that from this point on, RWBY would be incorporating darker and more mature elements to the story. He advised those responsible "for a very young viewer" to watch the episodes before deciding if they want to show them to a child. Volume 3 concluded on February 13, 2016. This was the last volume in which Oum was credited as a writer.

(2016–17)
Volume 4 was announced by Gray Haddock on April 1, 2016, with the premiere set for Fall 2016. Before the season officially began, the "Volume 4 Character Short" was screened at RTX 2016 and was later released online on October 3, 2016, the first "trailer" since Volume 1 to include a unique part of the story. Chapter 1 premiered on October 22, 2016 for Rooster Teeth "First members" (formerly "sponsors"), 24 hours later for members of the Rooster Teeth website, and one week later for the general public on YouTube. Weekly release day and time were the same as for Volume 3. This release schedule was continued throughout the Volume, which concluded on February 4, 2017.
 
Volume 4 picks up about six to eight months after the Fall of Beacon in Volume 3's finale and is the first series produced on Autodesk Maya after transitioning from Poser.

(2017–18) 

The fifth Volume premiered on October 14, 2017, a date which was first announced at the RTX Austin 2017 event. The episodes were released to Rooster Teeth FIRST members Saturdays at 10am CT, then to Rooster Teeth registered members the following Tuesday, and to the general public the following Saturday.

On July 17, 2017, Rooster Teeth released the first trailer for the upcoming Volume, the "Volume 5 Weiss Character Short". It was followed up by the "Volume 5 Blake Character Short" on September 4, 2017, and the "Volume 5 Yang Character Short" on October 14, 2017. These Character Shorts, like the original four trailers and the "Volume 4 Character Short", tell unique parts of the story.

At New York Comic Con 2017, it was announced that Volume 5 would be 14 episodes long, instead of the usual 12. The season concluded on January 20, 2018. It is the final season to be released on YouTube, following various Rooster Teeth videos being subsequently demonetized.

(2018–19)

Announced at RTX Austin 2018, the sixth season premiered on October 27, 2018.

On August 17, 2018, Rooster Teeth released the "Volume 6 Adam Character Short" prior to the season's premiere. Focusing on Adam Taurus, the short tells a unique part of the story similar to the original four trailers and the various Volume 4 & 5 character shorts.

Taking a regular Christmas break mid-season, Volume 6 concluded on January 26, 2019.

Unlike prior seasons, Volume 6 did not originally air on YouTube following various Rooster Teeth videos being demonetized. Volume 6 episodes later began airing on YouTube on November 2, 2019, alongside the Volume 7 premiere on the Rooster Teeth website.

(2019–20)

The seventh season premiered on November 2, 2019, concluding on February 1, 2020. It is the first season since Volume 3 not to include a character short and the first without a post-credits scene.

(2020–21)

The eighth season premiered on November 7, 2020 and concluded on March 27, 2021. It is the final season to premiere on the Rooster Teeth website.

Although the season took its regular Christmas mid-season break, due to the impact of the COVID-19 pandemic in the United States in regards to a slower production rollout with working remotely, the break was extended through January 2021 to early February. The tenth chapter was then delayed a week to February 27 to focus on the production team's safety during the February 13–17, 2021 North American winter storm, resulting in the season's conclusion being pushed back to March 27.

(2023)

The ninth season premiered on February 18, 2023, following a delay from a presumed late 2021 date, originally due to continued production slowdown amid the ongoing pandemic, in addition to production of the crossover film Justice League x RWBY: Super Heroes & Huntsmen.

The season is the first to be released exclusively on Crunchyroll. It will then release on the Rooster Teeth website in early 2024, following a one-year period of exclusivity.

World of Remnant
World of Remnant is a series of short special videos detailing recurring story elements in RWBY. Each episode explains details about a specific topic and are narrated by a character from the show. The first four World of Remnant episodes were released alongside Volume 2, narrated by Jen Taylor, the "mysterious narrator" in Volume 1s first episode who is later revealed to be the primary antagonist of the series, Salem. The four episodes released alongside Volume 3 were narrated by Shannon McCormick, the voice of Professor Ozpin. The eight episodes released alongside Volume 4 were narrated by Vic Mignogna, who voiced Qrow Branwen prior to the conclusion of Volume 6.

Season 1

Season 2

Season 3

Home media

Cinedigm released box sets for RWBY Seasons 1 through 6.  RWBY: Volume 7 will be released by Warner Bros. Home Entertainment as part of the next step in their expanding partnership with Rooster Teeth.

In Japan, Volume 1 was released on DVD and Blu-ray by Warner Bros. Japan on December 9, 2015, with a Japanese dub. Volume 2 and 3 were released on October 26, 2016 and December 3, 2016, respectively. Volume 4 was released on October 7, 2017. In 2021, Volume 5 was released on August 25, Volume 6 on September
29, Volume 7 on October 27, and Volume 8 on December 22.

Notes

References

External links
 

Lists of web series episodes